= Franco-Canadian =

Franco-Canadian may refer to:

- A collaboration between the France and Canada, similar to the term Franco-Canadian
- A shorthand form for French Canadian
